Hafiz Rashid Khan (born June 23, 1961) is a Bangladeshi postcolonialist poet, author, editor, journalist and Adibaasi researcher. His literary philosophy mostly comes from the practice of the Neo-colonialism and known as postcolonialist writer and reputed for working in the tribal area at the Chittagong Hill Tracts in Bangladesh. As of 2019, he wrote moreless twenty-five titles including fifteen poetry and eight criticism.

In 1982 at his twenty one years age his first poetry was published from Chittagong. In 2018 he published fifteen and the last poetry book titled Dinga Bhase Dakshin Samudrey.

He received several awards including, Chittagong City Corporation Literary Award for contributing in Bengali essay, honoured by Chittagong City Corporation in 2016. He also awarded Kolkata Little Magazine Library Award by Kolkata Little Magazine Library And Research Center for editing his  magazine Pushpakroth.

Biography

Hafiz Rashid Khan was born on June 23, 1961 in Banshkhali, Chittagong, East Pakistan (now Bangladesh). His father was a government employee. He grew up at Sulakbahar area. Hafiz earned a bachelor degree from the University of Chittagong. He currently served as a journalist at the daily newspaper Suprobhat Bangladesh in Chattogram.

Literary works
In 1982, Hafiz was published his first poetry Jostna Kemon Phutechhe. He works with several literary magazines during his early writings career. Renaissance, Dhaner Sheeshe Gaan, Brishti, Samujjal Sabatash since 1991, and Pushpakroth since 1993.

Personal life
Hafiz married Milattunnesa Khanom in 1995. They have two daughters Naisa Hafiz Khan Oichchhik and Raisa Hafiz Khan Oihik.

Bibliography

Poetry

Others poetry
 Phulbariar Nihoto Polashguli (1984)
 Sundirer Durgo (1984)
 Shreshtho Kobita (2019)

Criticism

Teenage Literature

Editorial
 Renaissance
 Dhaner Sheeshe Gaan
 Brishti
 Samujjal Sabatash (first edition in 1991)
 Pushpakroth (first edition in 1993)

Awards and honors

See also
 List of Bangladeshi poets

References

Sources

External links

 
 
 Hafiz Rashid Khan at Goodreads

Living people
1961 births
Bengali-language poets
Bengali poets
20th-century Bangladeshi poets
21st-century Bangladeshi poets
Bangladeshi male poets
Bengali-language writers
Bengali writers
20th-century Bangladeshi male writers
21st-century male writers
Bangladeshi journalists
University of Chittagong alumni
Chittagong College alumni
People from Chittagong
Writers from Chittagong